Cohesion are a four-piece indie rock band from Manchester. The group are:

Andrew O'Hara - vocals, guitar.
Kevin McPhillips - lead guitar.
Simon Harrison - bass.
Geoff Burroughs - drums, percussion.

The band were formed by O'Hara and McPhillips in 2003. Burroughs joined the duo in 2004, with Harrison completing the line-up in 2005. After a sustained period of playing gigs at local venues, the group have released two EPs independently, Cohesion EP and Shadows In The Shade EP (named after a lyric in the song 'Can't Ignore') to critical acclaim in the local press and internet music sites.

The band consider their influences to be bands such as The La's, Coldplay, The Flaming Lips, David Bowie, The Beach Boys, amongst others. Reviews of the band have noted the band's distinct 'West Coast' sound.

Cohesion are currently residing in Levenshulme, Manchester.

Discography 
EPs
 Cohesion EP (2005, Independent, COH/2005/001)
Behind Closed Doors
Everafter
Then There Was You

 Shadows In The Shade EP (2006, Independent 62PRTYCRMWLL06)
Behind Closed Doors
Can't Ignore
Everyone's Got Someone

Biography 
Cohesion were formed in Levenshulme, Manchester, in 2004 by singer-guitarist, Andrew O'Hara, and lead guitarist, Kevin McPhillips.  After quickly establishing a sound that best showcased O'Hara's distinctive vocal style, they spent 12 months refining their songs and building a following on the open-mic circuit.

In 2005, they expanded their core songwriting unit, recruiting Geoff Burroughs on drums, followed soon after by Simon Harrison on bass.

External links 
Official Website
Cohesion at BBC Manchester
Shadows In The Shade Review at Manchester Music

English alternative rock groups
English indie rock groups
British indie pop groups
Musical groups from Manchester
People from Levenshulme